Stéphane Bern, OBE (born 14 November 1963) is a French-Luxembourgish journalist, radio host and television presenter. He is known as a specialist in nobility and royalty. He has been awarded honours by several nations, including the Ordre des Arts et des Lettres (France), the Order of Grimaldi (Monaco), and the Order of the British Empire (United Kingdom).

Education and personal life 
Bern went to high school at Lycée Carnot in Paris, and he graduated from the École de management de Lyon in 1985. His parents, Melita Schlanger and Louis Bern, were born to Polish parents of Jewish families who had emigrated to Switzerland and France, before WW2. He came out in the magazine Têtu in October 2009 and in the documentary "Vie privée, vie publique" (by Mireille Dumas), which aired on France 3 on 6 November 2009.

Career

Magazines 
Bern was editor of the magazine Dynasty from 1985 to 1987, and then worked as a journalist for Jours de France in 1988. Since 1999, he has been the deputy editor (Events section) of the magazine Le Figaro Madame.

Radio 
Bern chronicled various royal families on Europe 1 from 1992 to 1997 before joining Radio Télévision Luxembourg and participating in the show Les Grosses Têtes. Since 2000, he has produced and hosted the show Le Fou du roi on France Inter, which is the most listened-to show in France during this time slot. He hosts Historiquement Vôtre with Mathieu Noël on Europe 1 since September 2020.

Television 
 Selected list
 1998–2003: Sagas (TF1)
 2003–06: 20 h 10 pétantes, which became Friday pétantes and Saturday pétantes (Canal+)
 2006–07: L'Arène de France (France 2)
 2007: Pourquoi les manchots n'ont-ils pas froid aux pieds ? ("Why don't penguins get cold feet?") (France 2)
 2007: Secrets d'histoire (France 2)
 2010: A program in honor of Philippe Bouvard, in January 2010 on the occasion of his fifty years of television (France 2)
 2010: Comment ça va bien ! (France 2)
 2021–2022: co-host of Eurovision France, c'est vous qui décidez ! (France 2)

Public service 
He was a member of the Nouvelle Action Royaliste political movement for 18 years, but left in 1999. He was alderman of the 9th arrondissement of Paris from 1999 to 2001, then President of the Conservatory of Music of that area.

A member since its inception in January 2001 of the Academy Grevin, he inaugurated the Grevin Wax Museum on 10 March 2008. Bern is also a member of the Cercle de l'Union interalliée and the Institute of the Royal House of France, and a sponsor of the Youth Club of that institute.

He was appointed by President Emmanuel Macron to raise funds for the national heritage.

Opinions 
Bern criticised the demolition of the historic Saint-Joseph Chapel of Saint-Paul College in Lille.

Works 
 Grace Kelly (2007), co-edited by Albin Michel – Nostalgie, Paris,  2007, 139 p. 
 Oubliez-moi, (2009) ed. Flammarion, Paris 
 Une vie de chien. Les animaux chéris des grands de ce monde, (2009) ed. Albin Michel, Paris 
 Au coeur de l'Écosse, (2009) ed. Flammarion, Paris, in collaboration with Franck Ferrand, William de Laubier, and Angelika Cawdor. 
 Le livre fou… du roi, (2010) ed. Flammarion, Paris 
 Secrets d'histoire, (2010) ed. Albin Michel, Paris
 Dictionnaire amoureux des royautés, (2010) ed. Plon, Paris

Filmography 
 2003: Laisse tes mains sur mes hanches directed by Chantal Lauby
 2006: Les aristos directed by Charlotte de Turckheim
 2015: Connasse, Princesse des cœurs directed by Eloïse Lang and Noémie Saglio
 2015: Merci pour tout, Charles directed by Ernesto Oña 
 2018: Meurtres en Lorraine by René Manzor : Nicolas Muller
2018: Mrs. Mills directed by Sophie Marceau.

Honours

National honours 
 : Officer of the Ordre des Arts et des Lettres (Order of Arts and Letters) in January 2010.
: Knight of the Legion of Honour in December 2018

Foreign honours 
 : Knight of the Order of Grimaldi in November 2011.
 : Commander with crown of the Order of Adolphe of Nassau in January 2013.
 : Officer of the Order of Leopold in March 2013.
 : Officer of the Most Excellent Order of the British Empire (OBE) in June 2014.
: Officer of the Order of Honour (Greece) in 2015

References

External links 

 Gotha, the official website of Stéphane Bern
 StéphaneBern.com

1963 births
Emlyon Business School alumni
Living people
Mass media people from Lyon
French LGBT journalists
Lycée Carnot alumni
French television personalities
French radio journalists
French radio presenters
French television presenters

Officiers of the Ordre des Arts et des Lettres
Knights of the Order of Grimaldi
Honorary Officers of the Order of the British Empire
French LGBT broadcasters
French male non-fiction writers
French LGBT writers
Radio France people
French people of Polish-Jewish descent
20th-century French Jews
Luxembourgian people of French descent
Luxembourgian people of Polish descent
Luxembourgian Jews
Le Figaro people
Eurovision commentators